The Improvised Explosive Device Countermeasure Equipment (ICE) is a vehicle-mounted electronics-based jamming system that uses low-power radio frequency energy to thwart enemy improvised explosive devices (IEDs). The radio frequency energy it emits blocks the signals broadcast by radio-controlled detonators, such as cell phones and cordless telephones, that would otherwise trigger the hidden IED to explode. ICE was developed by the Army Research Laboratory (ARL) at White Sands Missile Range and the Physical Science Laboratory (PSL) at New Mexico State University in 2004 to counter the rising IED threat in Iraq. Due to the urgent demand for counter-IED equipment, ICE was designed and built within three weeks and was provided to troops in less than six months after the project started.

ICE was designed to be adaptable to future adjustments in order to keep up with  changing IED technology. In addition, it was simple enough for soldiers to repair it at the unit level. Researchers later developed a portable version of ICE called Dismounted IED Countermeasures Equipment (DICE), which allowed soldiers to carry the jamming system in a backpack.

ICE proved to be largely successful against the IED threat and several thousand ICE systems were deployed to U.S. military personnel. In 2005, it was recognized as one of the U.S. Army’s "Top Ten Greatest Inventions of 2004," and the award was shared between those who spearheaded the project, ARL’s Shane Cunico, PSL’s Sam Mares, and Maj. Raymond Pickering.

References 

Disaster preparedness
Electronic warfare
War on terror
Military technology
Weapons countermeasures